Avola is an unincorporated community in the Canadian province of British Columbia, located in the Thompson-Nicola Regional District. The community is located along British Columbia Highway 5, approximately 190 kilometres north of Kamloops and 148 kilometres south of the highway's northern terminus at Tête Jaune Cache.

The community was originally established as Stillwater Flats. However, due to the existence of another Stillwater post office in the province, the new name Avola was selected when the community received its own post office in 1913.

In 2015, the Nature Conservancy of Canada acquired 7.4 acres of wetland and forest land in the community to form a protected habitat for salmon spawning.

References

Populated places in the Thompson-Nicola Regional District